Escape by Night may refer to:

 Escape by Night (1937 film), an American film
 Escape by Night (1953 film), a British film starring Sid James
 Escape by Night (1960 film), an Italian war film
 Clash by Night (1963 film), a British film released as 'Escape by Night' in the United States